The Geffen Film Company (also known as The Geffen Company, The Geffen Film Company, Inc., and later Geffen Pictures) was an American film distributor and production company founded by David Geffen, the founder of Geffen Records, and future co-founder of DreamWorks. The spherical Geffen Pictures logo (based on the logo of its record-label counterpart) was created by Saul Bass. Their most famous movies are Risky Business (1983), Little Shop of Horrors (1986), Beetlejuice (1988), and Interview with the Vampire (1994).

History 
Geffen founded the company in 1982, having recruited Eric Eisner as president, and distributed its films through Warner Bros. Geffen was operated as a division of Warner Bros., and as a result, following the company's shutdown in 1998, Warner Bros. now owns the company's library, with the exception of the 1996 Mike Judge comedy Beavis and Butt-Head Do America, which is owned by Paramount Pictures (via Paramount Animation, MTV Entertainment Studios and MTV Animation).

In 1993, Geffen and MTV Productions struck a two-picture deal.

In 1994, The Geffen Film Company was renamed and reorganized as DreamWorks Pictures, though the Geffen Pictures brand was continued to be used on films by David Geffen until 1998, when it was folded under the DreamWorks Pictures brand (including all of the company's library).

Filmography

Feature films

1980s

1990s

Television series

References 

Film distributors of the United States
Film production companies of the United States
 
Entertainment companies based in California
Companies based in Los Angeles
Entertainment companies established in 1980
Companies disestablished in 1998
1980 establishments in California
1998 disestablishments in California
Warner Bros.
DreamWorks Pictures
David Geffen